Benjamen "Ben" Wright (15 March 1942 – 22 January 2010) was an Australian Anglican bishop who was the Bishop of Bendigo from 1992 to 1993.

Wright was educated at Slade School, Warwick, Queensland and Murdoch University, Perth. He was  ordained in 1965. After a curacy at Applecross he held incumbencies at Narembeen, Alice Springs and Scarborough. He was Archdeacon of Stirling, then of the Goldfields and finally of O’Connor before his ordination to the episcopate.

References

1942 births
Murdoch University alumni
20th-century Anglican bishops in Australia
Anglican bishops of Bendigo
Assistant bishops in the Anglican Diocese of Perth
2010 deaths
Archdeacons of Stirling, WA